Pandit Prasun Banerjee (Bengali: প্রসুন ব্যানার্জী) ( – 22 March 1997) was a Hindustani classical vocalist from the Patiala Gharana.

He left college at age twenty and undertook music training, first from Jamini Ganguly and later from Jnan Prakash Ghosh. He was an A grade artist at All India Radio. In 1957 he married Meera Chatterjee and later both of them became disciples of Bade Ghulam Ali Khan. He taught classical music at the Calcutta School of Music and received the ITC award (1994) and the Bhuwalka award (1995).

1926 births
1997 deaths
Hindustani singers
Patiala gharana
Musicians from Patna
20th-century Indian male classical singers
Singers from Bihar
People from Patna district
20th-century Khyal singers
Musicians from West Bengal